An Arrow security is an instrument with a fixed payout of one unit in a specified state and no payout in other states.  It is a type of hypothetical asset used in the Arrow market structure model.  In contrast to the Arrow-Debreu market structure model, an Arrow market is a market in which the individual agents engage in trading assets at every time period t.  In an Arrow-Debreu model, trading occurs only once at the beginning of time.  An Arrow Security is an asset traded in an Arrow market structure model which encompasses a complete market.
Arrow Security is also called State Contingent Claim, Supershare Option.

See also
Arrow-Debreu security

References

Finance theories